No. 3 Security Forces Squadron (3SECFORSQN) is an RAAF Security Forces unit, whose mission is to provide security in support of air and space power assets and infrastructure.

Originally designated No. 3 Airfield Defence Squadron (3AFDS), the squadron was disbanded in the mid-2000's and its resources dispersed between No 1AFDS (RAAF Edinburgh) and No 2AFDS (RAAF Amberley).

On 4 July 2013, the RAAF's security capability was reorganised. Subsequently, No. 3 Security Forces Squadron was formed, with its headquarters based at RAAF Base Edinburgh.

The unit comprises personnel from the following Air Force categories and musterings:

 Ground Defence Officer
 Security Police Officer
 Personnel Capability Officer
 Logistics Officer
 Airfield Defence Guard
 Air Force Security (Security Operations)
 Air Force Security (Military Working Dog Handler)
 Airbase Protection
 Personnel Capability Specialist
 Supply

Squadron structure 

 Squadron Headquarters. Based at RAAF Base Edinburgh, South Australia.
 RAAF Edinburgh Security Flight.
 Rifle Flight Group, comprising HQ, Rifle Flight x 2 and C4ISR Flight. Based at RAAF Base Edinburgh, South Australia.
 Airbase Protection Flight (Reserve personnel). Based at RAAF Base Edinburgh, South Australia.
 RAAF Pearce Security Flight. Based at RAAF Pearce, Western Australia.

References

3
3